Edmond Byron Sumner (born December 31, 1995) is an American professional basketball player for the Brooklyn Nets of the National Basketball Association (NBA). A point guard, he played college basketball for the Xavier Musketeers and after averaging 15.0 points per game as a junior he participated in the 2017 NBA draft. He was drafted 52nd overall by the New Orleans Pelicans, but was subsequently traded to the Indiana Pacers.

College career
Sumner spent three years playing for the Xavier Musketeers (at Xavier University, Cincinnati) from 2014 to 2017. Sumner was sidelined with an injury in an 82—77 win against St. John's in January 2017 and did not play the rest of the season. At that point, he was averaging 14.9 points, 4.9 assists and 4.4 rebounds per game. This was not the first time he had suffered knee issues; his freshman season was cut to just six games as he withdrew from further playing due to chronic tendinitis in his knees.

Professional career

Indiana Pacers (2017–2021)
On June 23, 2017, Sumner was selected by the New Orleans Pelicans, only to be traded to the Indiana Pacers in exchange for cash considerations. Sumner signed a two-way contract with the Pacers on July 5, 2017, becoming the first second round draft pick to sign such a deal. In the 2017–18 season, Sumner struggled for minutes and spent significant time with the Pacers' G-League team, the Fort Wayne Mad Ants.

Sumner's limited minutes continued into the beginning of the 2018–19 season, but when teammate Victor Oladipo suffered a season-ending injury of a quadriceps tendon rupture his playing time increased significantly, and was given his first NBA start, against the Golden State Warriors. On February 11, 2019, Sumner signed a standard NBA contract with the Pacers, which was reported to be a two-year contract.

On July 29, Sumner inked a three-year contract worth $6.48 million with the Pacers after declining his $1.6 million team option in late June.

During the 2020–21 season, Sumner averaged 7.5 points and 1.8 rebounds per game, shooting 52.5 percent from the floor. In April 2021, he posted consecutive 20-point games against the Detroit Pistons and the Orlando Magic. On September 9, 2021, it was announced that Sumner would be sidelined indefinitely with a torn Achilles tendon.

Brooklyn Nets (2022–present) 
On October 6, 2021, Sumner was traded, alongside a 2025 second-round pick, to the Brooklyn Nets in exchange for the draft rights to Juan Pablo Vaulet. Four days later, he was waived by the Nets.

On July 8, 2022, Sumner re-signed with the Nets.

Career statistics

NBA

Regular season

|-
| style="text-align:left;"|
| style="text-align:left;"|Indiana
| 1 || 0 || 2.0 || 1.000 ||  ||  || 1.0 || .0 || .0 || .0 || 2.0
|-
| style="text-align:left;"|
| style="text-align:left;"|Indiana
| 23 || 2 || 9.1 || .344 || .259 || .625 || 1.0 || .4 || .5 || .2 || 2.9
|-
| style="text-align:left;"|
| style="text-align:left;"|Indiana
| 31 || 3 || 14.4 || .430 || .264 || .552 || 1.5 || 1.8 || .5 || .3 || 4.9
|-
| style="text-align:left;"|
| style="text-align:left;"|Indiana
| 53 || 24 || 16.2 || .525 || .398 || .819 || 1.8 || .9 || .6 || .2 || 7.5
|- class="sortbottom"
| style="text-align:center;" colspan="2"|Career
| 108 || 29 || 14.1 || .474 || .333 || .728 || 1.5 || 1.1 || .6 || .2 || 5.7

Playoffs

|-
| style="text-align:left;"|2019
| style="text-align:left;"|Indiana
| 1 || 0 || 2.0 ||  ||  ||  || 2.0 || .0 || .0 || .0 || .0
|-
| style="text-align:left;"|2020
| style="text-align:left;"|Indiana
| 3 || 0 || 13.7 || .286 || .000 || 1.000 || 2.0 || .0 || .0 || .0 || 2.0
|- class="sortbottom"
| style="text-align:center;" colspan="2"|Career
| 4 || 0 || 10.8 || .286 || .000 || 1.000 || 2.0 || .0 || .0 || .0 || 1.5

College

|-
| style="text-align:left;"|2014–15
| style="text-align:left;"|Xavier
| 6 || 0 || 7.2 || .200 || .000 || .667 || .8 || 1.0 || .3 || .0 || 1.3
|-
| style="text-align:left;"|2015–16
| style="text-align:left;"|Xavier
| 31 || 29 || 25.9 || .397 || .301 || .727 || 3.4 || 3.6 || 1.3 || .2 || 11.0
|-
| style="text-align:left;"|2016–17
| style="text-align:left;"|Xavier
| 22 || 19 || 31.7 || .479 || .273 || .735 || 4.1 || 4.8 || 1.2 || .7 || 14.3
|- class="sortbottom"
| style="text-align:center;" colspan="2"|Career
| 59 || 48 || 26.1 || .429 || .285 || .730 || 3.4 || 3.8 || 1.2 || .4 || 11.2

References

External links

 Xavier Musketeers bio

1995 births
Living people
21st-century African-American sportspeople
African-American basketball players
American men's basketball players
Basketball players from Detroit
Brooklyn Nets players
Fort Wayne Mad Ants players
Indiana Pacers players
New Orleans Pelicans draft picks
Point guards
Shooting guards
Xavier Musketeers men's basketball players